Lindsay Jo Rimer (17 February 1981 – ca.7 November 1994) was a thirteen-year-old British girl from Hebden Bridge, West Yorkshire, who was murdered. She was last seen alive buying cornflakes at a SPAR shop on Crown Street in Hebden Bridge on 7 November 1994, and her body was found about a mile away in the Rochdale  Canal which passes through the town on 12 April 1995. Despite repeated appeals for information by police, her murder remains unsolved.

Over the years, a number of speculative theories have been promoted linking Rimer's murder to known criminals, and police have investigated killers such as John Taylor, the murderer of Leanne Tiernan. In 2016, West Yorkshire Police announced that they had managed to isolate a DNA profile of the killer. 

The initial investigations into Rimer's disappearance were the subject of the first episode of Channel 4's series Deadline, which followed journalists from Yorkshire Television as they reported on the case. It featured interviews with the Rimer family and the reconstruction of the girl's trip to the SPAR shop, in which her sister played the role of Lindsay. Shortly after the documentary was aired, Rimer's body was found.

Rimer's disappearance was the inspiration for the play Eclipse, which was the first play written by playwright and current Poet Laureate Simon Armitage.

Life
Rimer lived with her parents, two sisters and her brother in the family home on Cambridge Street in Hebden Bridge. She was in Year 9 at Calder High School and was described as a "popular" pupil.

Last sighting

Rimer was last seen alive on the evening of 7 November 1994. At about 10:00p.m., she left her home to buy a packet of cornflakes from the SPAR supermarket in Crown Street. On her way to the shop she briefly stopped by a local pub, the Trades Club in Holme Street, where her mother was having a drink with a friend. Her mother asked her if she wanted to stay and have a cola with them, but Lindsay said no and continued to the shop. CCTV footage from the shop showed her paying for the cornflakes at 10:22p.m. That remains the last known sighting of Lindsay alive. She failed to return home that night, although as her mother was out and her father had been on the phone between 9:45 and 10:20 p.m., neither noticed she had not returned home that evening. When she did not turn up for her paper round the following morning, the alarm was raised.

Missing person inquiry
Police initially suspected that Rimer might have run away. There was local speculation that Rimer had been having problems at home, although this was strenuously denied by her family. Rimer's older sister, Katie, took part in a reconstruction of Rimer's walk to the shop and hundreds of local people joined the police in searches of the area around Hebden Bridge, but no trace of Rimer was found. Parts of the Rochdale Canal and River Calder along her route home were searched but she was not found.

Body found and post-mortem
Rimer's body was found by two canal workers in the Rochdale Canal, about a mile from the centre of Hebden Bridge and close to Rawden Mill lock, on 12 April 1995. It had been weighed down with a concrete boulder to stop it floating to the surface, and had probably been dislodged during dredging operations in that section of the canal over the preceding days. She was found fully dressed in the clothes she was wearing when she disappeared. The part of the canal she was found in was next to a well-lit factory, and the fact that the killer had apparently known that this apparently busy factory had no security after dark made police believe that the man had local knowledge.

Police had previously searched parts of the canal, but said after the discovery of Rimer's body that they had not searched the section where she was found. Detectives admitted this had been a mistake and said they should have searched upstream instead, in part because the flow of the water in the canal could have taken her body upstream from Hebden Bridge towards where she was eventually found. However, detectives would later clarify that they believed that she had been put into the section of the canal by the factory. The 20lb stone that had been used to weigh down Rimer's body was also found to have come from next to the canal. 

The post-mortem was carried out later that day at Royal Halifax Royal Infirmary by Home Office pathologist Professor Mike Green. He concluded that Lindsay Rimer had probably been strangled to death. Her voicebox had been flattened against the spinal column and there were also signs of congestion across the middle of the neck muscles. There were no signs of a sexual assault, and Green concluded that the attack had not been of a sexual nature.

Murder inquiry

Initial considerations
Detectives believed Rimer was killed the same night she disappeared and placed in the canal by her killer hours before she was reported missing on the morning of 8 November. They also believed that she had likely been killed by someone she knew. She was described as a "cautious" girl who would most likely only get into a vehicle with someone she trusted. The canal she was found in ran close to the street where the Rimer family lived. Police revealed that they thought Rimer had walked home along an unlit path that runs a few yards from her house.

The lead DSI, Tony Whittle, suggested that the killer may not have meant to kill Lindsay, saying: "Possibly someone she knew very well offered her a lift. Unbeknown to her he could have been sexually attracted to her, took her to the factory and when she struggled and screamed, perhaps he killed her by mistake."

After her initial disappearance, police had discovered that a car that had been stolen in Leeds the night before Rimer vanished had been spotted several times in Hebden Bridge around when she was last seen. The car was a red Honda Civic registered FYY 215W, and had been stolen from Meanwood on 6 November. It was spotted at around 9pm in Hebden Bridge the night before Rimer disappeared, and was spotted again in the town in the evening of 12 November. Police attempted to trace the vehicle and the driver, who was described as a bearded male. The man further raised suspicions after it was discovered that he had tried to chat up several teenage girls in the town around the time Rimer vanished, with some of these girls being Rimer's schoolfriends. After Rimer's body was found detectives stated that the man had also been spotted near the SPAR shop Rimer was last seen at, and revealed he had still not been traced. 

Two months after Rimer's body was found, police released pictures of shoppers caught on security cameras at the SPAR shop on the evening of the disappearance. It was revealed that a number of the shoppers had not been traced, and police appealed for these individuals to come forward as they felt they may have held information which would prove crucial to the inquiry.

A year after Rimer's disappearance, it was theorised by detectives that Rimer could have met her killer only days before she disappeared at the Hebden Bridge bonfire on 5 November 1994. Police appealed for anyone who held any relevant information to come forward.

Continuing investigations
In the late 1990s, Rimer's murder was investigated as part of Operation Enigma, which was a national cross-force police enquiry set up to review the unsolved murders of 207 women across Britain. In part it aimed to examine possible links between murders and examine whether unidentified serial killers could be at large. However, Enigma ruled out the possibility of there being links between Rimer's murder and other killings.

In 2000, forensic psychologist Richard Badcock told police that the killing may have had a sexual element to it. He asserted that she may have been killed after she rebuffed the killer's sexual advances, and also claimed that she was killed close to where her body was discovered.

In the years since the discovery of Rimer's body, the police have taken hundreds of witness statements and spoken to more than 5,000 people during their investigation. More than 1,200 vehicles were examined in the first year of the investigation. Detectives have investigated a number of convicted murderers and sex offenders who were still at liberty at the time of the murder. John Taylor, jailed for life in 2002 for the murder of Leeds teenager Leanne Tiernan, and John Oswin (jailed for life in 1998 for two rapes) have both been investigated, but no evidence has been found to link either to Lindsay Rimer's murder. 

In April 2016, West Yorkshire Police said a DNA profile had been obtained by a Canadian team of forensic specialists. The police hoped it would identify the killer.

On 8 November 2016, an unnamed 63-year-old man from Bradford was arrested on suspicion of the murder. He was later released on police bail. A second suspect, aged 68, was arrested by West Yorkshire Police on suspicion of murder on 25 April 2017 in Bradford.

Gordon Rimer 
Rimer's father Gordon was convicted of defrauding his employer's company in 2007. Gordon Rimer had been working for a canal cruises company, working on the same stretch of canal Lindsay's body was found.

Theories 

In 2003 it was reported that detectives were investigating a possible link to double murderer Tony King and that they had sought out a copy of his DNA. However, police subsequently stated to the press that any suggestion that King was linked to Rimer's killing was pure speculation.

In 2007, crime writer Wensley Clarkson published a book claiming Francisco Arce Montes, responsible for the highly publicised murder of Caroline Dickinson, was Rimer's killer. Dickinson was a 13-year-old British schoolgirl who was killed by Montes as she slept in a hostel during a visit to France with her class. In the book, titled The Predator: Portrait of a Serial Killer, Clarkson said that Montes was on a hunting trip in Yorkshire on 7 November 1994 and likely abducted and murdered Rimer that night in a sexually motivated killing, since his preference was to target girls between 12 and 14. However, Rimer's mother said she was "highly sceptical" of the claims and detectives working on the murder enquiry said that it was the first they had heard of it. The information that Montes may have been responsible came from a retired police officer, although Clarkson refused to disclose which force the officer worked with and was unable to confirm if there was any evidence Montes was in Hebden Bridge on the day. However, he said that Montes had recently been visiting York while working as a waiter at a London hotel. A spokesperson for West Yorkshire Police said they would seek to establish the factual basis of the claims made in the book.

In 2017, retired detective sergeant John Matthews from Cleveland Police stated that a man he had questioned in connection with the murders of Tina Bell and Julie Hogg had connections to Hebden Bridge and the Rimer family. He suggested that the man, who died in 2005, should have been considered as part of the investigation into Lindsay's murder. The man was named Vince Robson and had moved to Hebden Bridge in 1990. He had worked at the Trades Club where Rimer visited shortly before she disappeared. 

In 2018, investigative journalists Tim Hicks and Chris Clark suggested that Lindsay Rimer could have been murdered by convicted killer Christopher Halliwell. However, this can easily be disproved by police with DNA, as they have since 2016 had a full profile of Rimer's killer and already have Halliwell's DNA on file.

In popular culture

On 20 March 1995, shortly before Rimer's body was found, a documentary on the investigations into Rimer's disappearance was published as the first episode of the Channel 4 series Deadline. The documentary followed journalists at Yorkshire Television's local news service, Calendar, and showed interviews with Rimer's parents and the reconstruction of Rimer's last trip to the SPAR shop, where the role of Lindsay was played by her sister.

The disappearance of Rimer was the inspiration for the play Eclipse, which was the first play written by playwright and current UK Poet Laureate Simon Armitage. It was written in 1996, and part of the storyline focused on children who were obsessed with ritual, magic and superstition, which Armitage thought reflected the character of the community in Hebden Bridge.

See also
List of solved missing person cases
List of unsolved murders in the United Kingdom (1990s)
Disappearance of Suzy Lamplugh
Murder of Vera Holland – similar 1996 UK unsolved case

UK cold cases where the offender's DNA is known:
Murder of Deborah Linsley
Murders of Eve Stratford and Lynne Weedon
Murders of Jacqueline Ansell-Lamb and Barbara Mayo
Murder of Lyn Bryant
Murder of Janet Brown
Murder of Linda Cook 
Murder of Melanie Hall
Batman rapist – subject to Britain's longest-running serial rape investigation

External links
           March 1995 Deadline documentary into Rimer's disappearance. Shortly after the documentary was aired, her body was found.

Notes

References

Bibliography

1990s in West Yorkshire
1990s missing person cases
1994 in England
1994 murders in the United Kingdom
Deaths by person in England
Formerly missing people
Hebden Bridge
Incidents of violence against girls
Missing person cases in England
Murder in West Yorkshire
November 1994 crimes
November 1994 events in the United Kingdom
Unsolved murders in England
Female murder victims